Salford City may refer to:

The City of Salford
Salford City F.C., an association football club from the city
Salford Red Devils, a professional rugby league club from the city formerly known as the Salford City Reds
Salford City Roosters, an amateur rugby league club from the city